George Potter Darrow (February 4, 1859 – June 7, 1943) was a Republican member of the U.S. House of Representatives from Pennsylvania.

George Darrow was born in Waterford, Connecticut.  He graduated from Alfred University in Alfred, New York, in 1880.  He moved to Philadelphia, Pennsylvania, in 1888 and engaged in banking, in the manufacture of paints, and in the insurance business.  He was president of the Twenty-second Sectional School Board of Philadelphia 1906–09, and a member of the Philadelphia Common Council 1910–15.

Darrow was elected to Congress as a Republican in 1914 to the 64th Congress and served until he was succeeded January 3, 1937.  He had been an unsuccessful candidate for reelection in 1936.  He was elected to the 67th Congress and served from January 3, 1939 to January 3, 1941.  He was not a candidate for renomination in 1940.

Darrow died in Philadelphia, Pennsylvania, and is buried there at Ivy Hill Cemetery.

References

External links
 

1859 births
1943 deaths
People from Waterford, Connecticut
School board members in Pennsylvania
Alfred University alumni
Philadelphia City Council members
Republican Party members of the United States House of Representatives from Pennsylvania
Burials at Ivy Hill Cemetery (Philadelphia)